Fouda (فوده) is a surname. It may also be transliterated from Arabic script as Foda or Fawda

The surname may refer to:
Farag Fouda, Egyptian writer and human rights activist
Séraphin Magloire Fouda, Cameroonian politician and economist
Yosri Fouda, Egyptian journalist